Jackie Yi-Ru Ying (born 1966) is an American nanotechnology scientist based in Singapore. She is the founding executive director of the Institute of Bioengineering and Nanotechnology (IBN).

Early life and career
Ying was born in Taipei in 1966. She moved to Singapore with her family in 1973 as a child where she was a student at Rulang Primary School and Raffles Girls' School. She then went to New York City, earning a B.Eng. degree by graduating summa cum laude from Cooper Union in 1987. She then attended Princeton University, receiving her MA in 1988 and her PhD in 1991, both in chemical engineering. She spent a year as a Humboldt Fellow at the Institute for New Materials in Saarbrücken and researched nanocrystalline materials with Herbert Gleiter.

Ying became a professor in the Department of Chemical Engineering at the Massachusetts Institute of Technology (MIT) in 1992. She was made a full professor in 2001; at 35 she was one of MIT's youngest full professors.

Ying returned to Singapore in 2003 to serve as the first executive director of the Institute of Bioengineering and Nanotechnology, a division of the Agency for Science, Technology and Research (A*STAR). Her research concerns the biomedical and catalytic applications of nanostructured systems and materials. She has been in Singapore ever since.

In March 2018, Ying stepped down from her position as Executive Director at the Institute of Bioengineering and Nanotechnology to lead her own lab, NanoBio lab.

Honours and awards 
During 2008, Ying was chosen by the American Institute of Chemical Engineers as an Engineer of the Modern Era. Ying was elected to the Singapore Women's Hall of Fame in 2014.

In December 2015, it was announced that she was one of the recipients of the inaugural 2015 Mustafa Prize awarded by the Mustafa Science and Technology Foundation. She was awarded the "Top Scientific Achievement" award for "her great scientific and technological contributions and achievements to the synthesis of well-designed advanced nanostructured materials and systems, nanostructured biomaterials and miniaturised biosystems for various interesting applications". In 2016, she was elected to the Cooper Union Hall of Fame for her achievements.

When the National Academy of Inventors gave Ying a fellowship in 2017, she was the first Singaporean to receive this honour. In 2020, Ying received a Lifetime Achievement Award from the Journal of Drug Targeting for "her many outstanding contributions in the fields of nanotechnology and nanomedicine including drug delivery and targeting." In 2021, she was elected to the National Academy of Engineering. She has served as the Editor in Chief of Nano Today, and is currently advising the journal as Editor Emeritus. In 2023 she was awarded the King Faisal Prize.

Personal life 
Ying is a practicing Muslim, having converted to the faith in her early 30s.

References

External links
Biography at Institute of Bioengineering and Nanotechnology, Agency for Science, Technology and Research

1966 births
 Living people
 Cooper Union alumni
 MIT School of Engineering faculty
 American nanotechnologists
 Scientists from Taipei
 Princeton University School of Engineering and Applied Science alumni
 Converts to Islam
 Taiwanese emigrants to Singapore
 Singaporean Muslims
 Singaporean emigrants to the United States
 American people of Taiwanese descent
 American people of Chinese descent
 Singaporean scientists
 American Muslims
 Raffles Girls' Secondary School alumni